BT4 or BT-4 may refer to:
 BT-4, a type of BT tank Soviet light tanks
 BT-4 (rocket engine), a rocket engine manufactured by IHI Aerospace
 BT-4 Combat, a paintball marker originally manufactured by BT Paintball
 Brabham BT4, a Formula One racing car
 BT4, a BT postcode area for Belfast